The women's long jump event  at the 1977 European Athletics Indoor Championships was held on 13 March in San Sebastián.

Results

References

Long jump at the European Athletics Indoor Championships
Long
Euro